Nuwan Indika (born 13 November 1985) is a Sri Lankan cricketer. He made his first-class debut for Chilaw Marians Cricket Club in the 2003–04 Premier Trophy on 16 January 2004.

See also
 List of Chilaw Marians Cricket Club players

References

External links
 

1985 births
Living people
Sri Lankan cricketers
Chilaw Marians Cricket Club cricketers
Place of birth missing (living people)